A debutante is a girl or young lady from an aristocratic or upper-class family introduced to society at a formal "debut" presentation.

Debutante may also refer to:

Music
Debutante (Nash Kato album) (2000)
Debutante (Cait Brennan album) (2016)
"Debutante", a 1995 song by Aztec Camera from Frestonia
"Debutante", a 2000 song by U.S. Crush from U.S. Crush
"Debutante", a 2002 song by The Ziggens
"Debutante", a 2007 song by Great Lakes Myth Society from Compass Rose Bouquet
"Debutante", a 2010 song by 65daysofstatic from We Were Exploding Anyway
"The Debutante", a 1917 trumpet composition by Herbert L. Clarke
The Debutantes, a vocal group that sang "Optimistic Voices" for the 1939 film The Wizard of Oz
The Debutantes, a vocal girl group, in the United States, in the 1960s

Other uses
The Debutantes (film), a Philippine film
Debutantes (book series), young adult series by Jennifer Lynn Barnes

See also
The Debutante Hour, a trio based in New York City
Debutante Stakes (disambiguation)